Beer cheese may refer to:

 Weisslacker, a German cheese
 Beer cheese (spread), a regional snack food
 Beer soup